The hybrid elm Ulmus davidiana var. japonica × U. minor was raised at the Arnold Arboretum before 1924.

Description
The old specimen in the Morton Arboretum, Illinois (2014), is an open-branched tree, more broad than tall, with ascending branches, the bark breaking into shallow vertical plates.

Cultivation
One specimen survives at the Morton Arboretum. The hybrid was cultivated at the Baarn elm research institute, The Netherlands, in the mid-20th century. It is not known to have been introduced to Australasia.

Accessions
North America
Morton Arboretum, Illinois, US. Acc. no. 2351–24. Raised from seed of the tree at the Arnold Arboretum.

References

External links
  Sheet labelled U. japonica × Ulmus carpinifolia; samara and new leaves ; Baarn specimen (1962)
  Sheet labelled U. japonica × Ulmus carpinifolia; long and short shoots; Baarn specimen (1962)
  Sheet labelled U. japonica × Ulmus carpinifolia; flowers; Baarn specimen (1962)
  Sheet labelled U. japonica × Ulmus carpinifolia; Baarn specimen (1962)

Ulmus hybrids
Ulmus articles missing images
davidiana var. japonica x U. minor